Yordano, born Giordano Di Marzo Migani, is an Italian–born Venezuelan singer-songwriter and guitar player.

Early life
Born on October 27, 1951 in Rome, Italy, Yordano moved with his parents to Caracas at an early age (11) and was educated in the common schools there. He then graduated as an architect from Central University of Venezuela, where he participated in musical events and other endeavors. While attending the University, he became known as a prolific songwriter. Yordano lengthened his stride as he formed original bands to showcase his music.

Professional career
But it was not until 1978 when Yordano decides to undertake a musical career, when he performed as vocalist and guitarist of the group Sietecuero with his brother the singer Evio di Marzo, which recorded an album in Puerto Rico. In 1982, he released his first solo album Negocios son Negocios on Polygram. Two years later, he followed with his second album, Yordano, which brought him some public recognition. He then moved to Sonográfica in 1986.

His breakout year came in 1992, when his song Por estas calles (On These Streets), included in the album  De Sol a Sol, was used as the opening theme for the telenovela with the same title. It was broadcast by Radio Caracas Televisión through 627 episodes between 1992 and 1994 and was very popular in Venezuela. As a result, De Sol a Sol topped the country and pop album charts for more than two years, which led Yordano to achieve celebrity status in his homeland.

After that, Yordano released many solid but unspectacular albums and made guest appearances on records by some of Venezuela's top artists, including Ilan Chester and Simón Díaz.

In between, Yordano toured Colombia, Chile, Dominican Republic, Ecuador, Mexico, Miami, Panama, Puerto Rico, Spain and Texas.

Late years
In August 2014, Yordano was diagnosed with myelodysplastic syndrome (MDS). He was operated successfully in January 2015 in the City of New York, and followed the treatment schedule with all backup investigational and medical supportive services.

Selected discography

As soloist

As guest vocalist

Sources

1951 births
Living people
Singers from Caracas
Venezuelan architects
20th-century Venezuelan male singers
Venezuelan people of Italian descent
Venezuelan pop singers
Venezuelan songwriters
Male songwriters
21st-century Venezuelan male singers
Latin music songwriters
Latin Grammy Lifetime Achievement Award winners